Irena Tuwim (1899–1987) was a Polish poet and translator. She translated Winnie-the-Pooh and The House at Pooh Corner to Polish.

References

1899 births
1987 deaths
Polish translators
20th-century Polish poets
20th-century translators